

Friedrich-Carl Rabe von Pappenheim (5 October 1894 – 9 June 1977) was a general in the Wehrmacht of Nazi Germany during World War II. He was a recipient of the Knight's Cross of the Iron Cross. Pappenheim surrendered to the Soviet troops in May 1945. Convicted as a war criminal in the Soviet Union, he was held until 1955.

Awards 
 Iron Cross (1914)
 2nd Class (12 January 1915)
 1st Class (19 April 1917)
 Honour Cross of the World War 1914/1918
 Knight First Class of the Order of the White Rose of Finland (6 September 1937)
 Estonian Order of the Eagle Cross 3rd Class (30 October 1937)
 Officer's Cross of the Order of the Crown of Italy (26 November 1937)
 Yugoslavian Order of the White Eagle (20 January 1938)
 Royal Dutch Order of Orange-Nassau with swords (19 February 1938)
 Iron Cross (1939)
 2nd Class (17 June 1940)
 1st Class (10 April 1941)
 German Cross in Gold (8 November 1944) 
 Knight's Cross of the Iron Cross on 30 April 1945 as Generalleutnant and commander of 97. Jäger-Division

See also
 Mechelen Incident
 May 1941 Sanski Most revolt

References

Citations

Bibliography

 

1894 births
1977 deaths
Lieutenant generals of the German Army (Wehrmacht)
Recipients of the Knight's Cross of the Iron Cross
German prisoners of war in World War II held by the Soviet Union
Military personnel from Münster
Recipients of the Order of Orange-Nassau
Recipients of the Military Order of the Cross of the Eagle, Class III
German Army personnel of World War I
German Army generals of World War II